Rolf Schult (16 April 1927 – 13 March 2013) was a German actor who specializes in dubbing. He provided the German dub for actor Robert Redford, among many others. Until the film Hannibal (2001), he provided the voice for Anthony Hopkins before he was replaced by Joachim Kerzel, and dubbed Patrick Stewart for much of his career.

He has also collaborated with the German trance/techno-band E Nomine on a number of their albums.

References

External links 

1927 births
2013 deaths
German male television actors
German male voice actors